Andraž Pograjc (born 26 September 1991 in Tbrovlje) is a Slovenian ski jumper.

Career
Pograjc is a member of club SSK Costella Ilirija. His world cup debut was on March 10, 2013 in Lahti where he reached 30th place and his first WC points.

In 2013 Planica world cup ski flying event he reached 17th place individual, personal best jump at 212.5 meters and his best world cup career result, 1st place in team event.

World Cup

Team podiums

References

External links

1991 births
Living people
Slovenian male ski jumpers
People from Trbovlje
21st-century Slovenian people